A forecast bias occurs when there are consistent differences between actual outcomes and previously generated forecasts of those quantities; that is: forecasts may have a general tendency to be too high or too low. A normal property of a good forecast is that it is not biased.

As a quantitative measure , the "forecast bias" can be specified as a probabilistic or statistical property of the forecast error. A typical measure of bias of forecasting procedure is the arithmetic mean or expected value of the forecast errors, but other measures of bias are possible. For example, a median-unbiased forecast would be one where half of the forecasts are too low and half too high: see Bias of an estimator.

In contexts where forecasts are being produced on a repetitive basis, the performance of the forecasting system may be monitored using a tracking signal, which provides an automatically maintained summary of the forecasts produced up to any given time. This can be used to monitor for deteriorating performance of the system.

See also 

Calculating demand forecast accuracy
Consensus forecast
Optimism bias
Demand forecasting
Exponential growth bias
Forecast skill

References 

Statistical forecasting
Bias
Supply chain analytics